Svend Erik Hovmand (born 8 December 1945, in Sakskøbing) is former member of Folketinget, the Danish parliament. He was representing the Liberal Party. He was Tax Minister in the Cabinet of Anders Fogh Rasmussen I from 27 November 2001 to 2 August 2004, when he was replaced by Kristian Jensen. He has been a member of parliament (Folketinget) since 9 January 1975. He was President of the Nordic Council in 2001.

References

1945 births
Living people
Government ministers of Denmark
Members of the Folketing
Danish Tax Ministers
People from Guldborgsund Municipality